A classmate is a student who is member of the same class, in any of its meanings (a course, a lesson, a graduating year).

Classmate(s) may also refer to:

 Classmates (1914 film), a 1914 silent film produced by the Biograph Company
 Classmates (1924 film), a silent drama film starring Richard Barthelmess
 Classmates (1952 film), a Swedish film directed by Schamyl Bauman
 Classmates (2006 film), a Malayalam film
 Classmates (2007 film), a Telugu remake of the 2006 film
 Classmates (2008 film), a Japanese film
 Classmates (2015 film), a Marathi remake of the 2006 film
 Classmates (TV series), an American reality TV show that aired in 2003
 Classmates (manga), a 2006 manga series
 Classmates.com, a social networking service
 Odnoklassniki, Russian version of Classmates, a social networking service
 Classmate PC, a personal computer
 Classmate Stationery, an Indian brand of student stationery products